Hoffman Hills State Recreation Area is a  unit of the Wisconsin state park system near Menomonie.  A network of trails provides access to wooded hills, prairie, and wetlands.  There are three picnic areas and a  observation tower.  Visitors are allowed to gather edible mushrooms, nuts, and berries, and hunting is allowed in the fall.

External links
Hoffman Hills State Recreation Area official site

Protected areas of Dunn County, Wisconsin
State parks of Wisconsin
Protected areas established in 1980
1980 establishments in Wisconsin